Sir Alec Guinness,  (1914–2000) was an English actor. After an early career on the stage, Guinness was featured in several of the Ealing Comedies, including The Ladykillers and Kind Hearts and Coronets in which he played nine different characters. He is known for his six collaborations with David Lean: Herbert Pocket in Great Expectations (1946), Fagin in Oliver Twist (1948), Col. Nicholson in The Bridge on the River Kwai (1957, for which he won the Academy Award for Best Actor), Prince Faisal in Lawrence of Arabia (1962), General Yevgraf Zhivago in Doctor Zhivago (1965), and Professor Godbole in A Passage to India (1984). He is also known for his portrayal of Obi-Wan Kenobi in George Lucas' original Star Wars trilogy; for the original film, he was nominated for Best Supporting Actor at the 50th Academy Awards.

Theatre

Filmography

Notes and references

Sources

External links 
 
 
 
 

Male actor filmographies
British filmographies